This complete list of works by American fantasy author David Eddings.

Bibliography
Eddings acknowledged that his wife, Leigh Eddings, contributed to all of his books, but publisher Lester del Rey believed that multi-authorships were a problem and that it would be better if David Eddings' name alone appeared on the books. Leigh Eddings was credited as a co-author starting with Belgarath the Sorcerer in 1995.

The Belgariad and The Malloreon 

The Belgariad is Eddings' first fantasy series; The Malloreon is the sequel. The books follow the adventures of Belgarion, Polgara, Belgarath, their companions, and learning the Will and the Word.

The Belgariad series 
 Pawn of Prophecy (1982)
 Queen of Sorcery (1982)
 Magician's Gambit (1983)
 Castle of Wizardry (1984)
 Enchanters' End Game (1984)

The Malloreon series 
 Guardians of the West (1987)
 King of the Murgos (1988)
 Demon Lord of Karanda (1988)
 Sorceress of Darshiva (1989)
 The Seeress of Kell (1991)

Books related to The Belgariad and The Malloreon 
 Belgarath the Sorcerer (1995) with Leigh Eddings
 Polgara the Sorceress (1997) with Leigh Eddings
 The Rivan Codex (1998) with Leigh Eddings

The Elenium and The Tamuli 

The Elenium and its sequel The Tamuli feature the Pandion Knight Sparhawk and his comrades.

The Elenium series 
 The Diamond Throne (1989)
 The Ruby Knight (1990)
 The Sapphire Rose (1991)

The Tamuli series 
 Domes of Fire (1992)
 The Shining Ones (1993)
 The Hidden City (1994)

The Dreamers series

The Dreamers series (written with Leigh Eddings) tells the story of a war between the Elder Gods and their allies and an entity known as the Vlagh.
 The Elder Gods (2003)
 The Treasured One (2004)
 Crystal Gorge (2005)
 The Younger Gods (2006)

Standalone fantasy novels 
 The Redemption of Althalus (2000) with Leigh Eddings, is a standalone novel about a thief who mends his ways.

Non-fantasy
 High Hunt (1973) – a story revolving around a hunting expedition that spirals out of control.
 The Losers (1992) – a story about a man struggling to rebuild his life after an accident.
 Regina's Song (2002) with Leigh Eddings – a thriller about a woman after the murder of her twin sister.

Unpublished
 How Lonely Are the Dead (1953) - written as a bachelor's thesis for Reed College.
 Man Running (1961) - written as a master's thesis for the University of Washington.
Hunseeker's Ascent - an unfinished story about mountain climbers.

References

Bibliographies by writer
Bibliographies of American writers
Fantasy bibliographies